The 2017 Arlington mayoral election was held on May 6, 2017 to elect the mayor of Arlington, Texas. The election was officially nonpartisan. It saw the reelection of incumbent mayor Jeff Williams.

If no candidate had obtained a majority of the vote, a runoff would have been held.

Results

References

Arlington
Arlington
2017
Non-partisan elections